Parapsammodius is a genus of aphodiine dung beetles in the family Scarabaeidae. There are at least four described species in Parapsammodius.

Species
These four species belong to the genus Parapsammodius:
 Parapsammodius bidens (Horn, 1871)
 Parapsammodius integer (Bates, 1887)
 Parapsammodius pseudointeger Verdu, Stebnicka & Galante, 2006
 Parapsammodius puncticollis (LeConte, 1858)

References

Further reading

 
 
 

Scarabaeidae
Articles created by Qbugbot